Tote may refer to:

Places
 Tote, Skye, a crofting township on the Isle of Skye

Container
 Tote bag, a carry bag that is often used to carry items too large for a purse or handbag; sometimes also sold as a reusable shopping bag
 IBC tote or intermediate bulk container tote

Organisations
 The Tote, British bookmakers
 Tote Ireland, a subsidiary of Horse Racing Ireland
 Totes Isotoner or Totes, an international umbrella, footwear, and cold weather accessory supplier
 TOTE Maritime, American shipping company
 Tote Tasmania, Tasmanian totalisator and bookmakers

Other uses
 Tote board, a large numeric or alphanumeric display used to convey information
 Tote (Transformers), a fictional character
 The Tote Hotel, a hotel, pub, bar and music venue in Melbourne, Australia
 Action regulation theory (T. O. T. E. Test - Operate - Test - Exit), an iterative problem solving strategy in psychology
 Tote (footballer) (Jorge López Marco, born 1978), Spanish footballer
 Parimutuel betting is sometimes known as a Tote

See also
 Total
 "Ol' Man River"